The Cibeno massacre was a massacre carried out by the SS on 12 July 1944 at the shooting range of Cibeno, a fraction- now a district - of Carpi, in which 67 people already imprisoned in the Fossoli camp died.

It has been defined as "the most heinous act committed in SS-occupied Italy on people interned in a concentration camp".

References 

Massacres in 1944
Massacres in Italy
1944 in Italy
World War II massacres
Massacres committed by Nazi Germany